I cherusci is a dramma per musica in 2 acts by Simon Mayr to a libretto by Gaetano Rossi. It was first performed at the Teatro Argentina, Rome, for Carnival 1808. The plot is at the time of the battles between the Germanic tribes the Marcomanni and Cherusci.

Cast
Treuta, tenor - popular leader of the Marcomanni people
Tusnelda, soprano - Treuta's slave, a Cheruscan, but due to be sacrificed by the druids
Tamaro, soprano - enemy leader of the Cherusci and bards
Zarasto, bass - high priest of the druids
Ercilda, soprano - allied with Treuta
Carilo, tenor - leader of the Sarronides, allied with Treuta
Dunclamo, tenor - adoptive father of Tusnelda, who later discovers that Treuta is Tusnelda's father
Araldo, tenor

Recording
I cherusci Bayerische Staatsoper, Franz Hauk. Naxos 2CD 2019

References

Operas
1808 operas
Operas by Simon Mayr